During 1994-95 season Football Club Internazionale Milano competed in Serie A, Coppa Italia and UEFA Cup.

Summary
In the summer of 1994, striker Marco Delvecchio rejoined the club while Gianluca Pagliuca moved from Sampdoria for a then world record fee for a goalkeeper of £7 million. Ottavio Bianchi was appointed as first team coach, replacing Gianpiero Marini. Unlike the previous season, Inter Milan did not win any trophies but regained some stability with a sixth place in the domestic league competition. Inter also won the Derby della Madonnina in the league since 1990–91 Season. However, the most significant event of the season saw Massimo Moratti, son of Angelo former President from May 1955 to May 1968 during La Grande Inter era, take charge of the club on 18 February 1995, which reignited the club as a force on the transfer market. The summer of 1995 saw English international Paul Ince and Brazilian starlet Roberto Carlos being bought. The 1994-95 season would be the final at the club for Dennis Bergkamp, Wim Jonk and Rubén Sosa.

Overview

Squad

Transfers

Winter

Serie A

League table

Results by round

Matches

Coppa Italia

First round

Second round

Eightfinals

Quarterfinals

UEFA Cup

First round

Statistics

Players statistics

Goalscorers
  Rubén Sosa 8
  Nicola Berti 5
  Pierluigi Orlandini 4
  Marco Delvecchio 4
  Dennis Bergkamp 3

References

Sources
  RSSSF - Italy 1994/95

Inter Milan seasons
Internazionale